A referendum on tourism development was held in the Pitcairn Islands in March 2001. The proposals put forward by Wellesley Pacific were approved by 78% of voters.

Background
A referendum was held in 1981 on the subject of building an airfield for the island. Although it was approved by 90% of voters, construction had proved too expensive.

Wellesley Pacific proposed the construction of a 30-bed hotel and an international airport on Oeno Island, with regular flights to Tahiti and New Zealand. A second airport would be built on Pitcairn island with two lodges, whilst Bounty Bay would be modified to allow boats to land. A processing plant would also be built to allow the development of a fishing industry. The company demanded exclusive rights to develop the islands, but said it would give 10% of profits to island residents. However, environmentalists raised concerns about the potential effects on the islands' unique plant and animal life.

Results

References

Pitcairn
2001 in the Pitcairn Islands
Referendums in the Pitcairn Islands
March 2001 events in Oceania